Oreophryne inornata is a species of frog in the family Microhylidae.
In Papua New Guinea it is endemic.
Its natural habitats are subtropical or tropical moist lowland forests and subtropical or tropical moist montane forests.

References

inornata
Amphibians of Papua New Guinea
Taxonomy articles created by Polbot
Amphibians described in 1956